Hum Tum Aur Ghost (earlier titled as Kaun Bola?! ) is a 2010 Indian Hindi supernatural comedy-drama film directed by Kabeer Kaushik and produced by Arshad Warsi, starring Arshad Warsi and Dia Mirza in the lead roles. This unofficial remake of Ghost Town was filmed in Newcastle upon Tyne, England, the film was released on 26 March 2010. The film was also inspired by the Hollywood films, The Sixth Sense and Heart and Souls (1993).

Plot 
In the world of Armaan (Arshad Warsi) and his girlfriend Gehna (Dia Mirza), life is truly beautiful, yet it's like walking on a tightrope. For Armaan, a debonair fashion photographer who is a charmer to the core and loved by all around him, life only gets better when he dates Gehna, a high-profile fashion magazine editor. Life is picture perfect and mash; a doting girlfriend and a job where his expertise makes him the most-wanted photographer in the London fashion world! Armaan has learnt that his chronic insomnia is, however, not a function of any sleeping disorder. The truth is that he hears voices; voices that torture him; voices that are disturbing him. More importantly, voices that nobody else can hear! Life is less than picture perfect now!

While his friends sympathize with his problems, his girlfriend Gehna is irritated with his weird behavior. Add to that her father Sinha (Javed Sheikh) constantly berates him for his fondness for the bottle. No one seems to understand his predicament. What puzzles them is that he talks to himself... or, rather, he talks to people who no one can see simply because they don't live. Soon, Armaan becomes aware of his special ability to connect with the souls that haven't crossed over. Equipped with a will to fulfill the wishes of these spirits who hound him, Armaan sets out on a mission to help out two souls: an old man, Mr. Virender Kapoor (Boman Irani), and a young woman, Carol (Zehra Naqvi). In this ensuing journey, Armaan discovers the lives of his two special companions and ends up frustrating Gehna. Yet, Armaan is on a journey where he discovers a lot about his own self and his own life.

After he fulfils Kapoor's wish, he goes to find Carol's son Danny. He realizes that he is Danny but, when he tries to explain this to Gehna, she gets fed up and leaves him. She is then involved in a car crash and almost dies and becomes a ghost. Carol urges Gehna to help Armaan/Danny and she comes back. After eight months, they get married, and Armaan stops seeing ghosts.

Cast 
 Arshad Warsi as Armaan Suri / Daniel "Danny" Fernandes 
 Dia Mirza as Gehna Sinha
 Sandhya Mridul as Mini
 Boman Irani as Virendra Kapoor
 Zehra Naqvi as Carol Fernandes, Arman's mother
 Shernaz Patel as Doctor Taniyah
 Ashwin Mushran as Aditya "Adi" Kapoor, Virendra's son
 Asawari Joshi as Pooja Kapoor, Virendra's wife
 Javed Sheikh as Mr. Vikas Sinha, Gehna's father 
 Tinnu Anand as Banker

Reception

Critical response 
Hum Tum Aur Ghost received generally mixed reviews from critics, though mostly negative. Mayank Shekhar of the Hindustan Times rated the film 1.5 out of 5, and said that "Playing a girl-magnet, designer-wear, slick hair NRI hero in an artificial, romantic setup, just pales his coolness no end. But then again, ambition is such a b****." Taran Adarsh of the Bollywood Hungama website, who rated it 2.5/5, wrote that "Hum Tum Aur Ghost is a terrible waste of a terrific idea. Disappointing!"

Box office 
Hum Tum Aur Ghost had a below average opening and collected only Rs. 4.90 crore during its theatrical run. Eventually, it was elevated to disaster status by Box Office India.

Soundtrack 

The music was composed by Shankar–Ehsaan–Loy and Julius Packiam, with the former composing the songs and the latter composing the film score. The lyrics for the songs were written by Javed Akhtar.

References

External links 
 
 

2010 films
2010s Hindi-language films
Indian ghost films
Films set in Newcastle upon Tyne
Viacom18 Studios films
Indian remakes of American films